SMU Guildhall is a graduate video game development program located at the Southern Methodist University (SMU). It was one of the first graduate video game development programs in the United States. In 2020, it was ranked #4 among the Top 25 Graduate Schools for Game Design by the Princeton Review.

History 

Originally located at the University's Plano, Texas facilities, Guildhall relocated to SMU's main campus in central Dallas at the Gerald J. Ford Hall for Research and Innovation in 2020.

Events 
 Exhibition: Students present their work at a pre-graduation exhibition. Graduation is accompanied by keynotes from established game developers. Speakers have included: Warren Spector, Gabe Newell, Jennell Jaquays, Richard Garriott, Randy Pitchford, JJ Richards, Mark Randel, Tom Hall, Ken Levine, Michael Gallagher, Ted Price, Adam Sessler, Richard Hilleman, Paul Barnett, Sr., Tim Sweeney, Greg Zeschuk, Rob Pardo, Dan Connors, Drew Murray, and Steve Nix.
 Career Fair: Semi-annual Career Fair, where studios and companies visit campus for interviews and networking.
 Open House: Semi-annual on-site event introducing the program and faculty to potential students.
 Guildhall Advanced Gaming Academy: Takes place in the summer, for middle school and high school students. Attendees learn how to make video games using Unity.
 Guest Speakers: Industry professionals speak to students and the community on various gaming topics.

External links 
 Official SMU Guildhall website

References 

Southern Methodist University
Video game universities
2003 establishments in Texas